The 2016 European Taekwondo Championships was the 22st edition of the European Taekwondo Championships, and was held in Montreux, Switzerland, from May 19 to May 22, 2016.

Medal table

Medal summary

Men

Women

Participating nations

References

External links 
 European Taekwondo Union

European Taekwondo Championships
European Championships
Taekwondo Championships
2016 in Swiss sport
International sports competitions hosted by Switzerland
Sport in Montreux